Housing.com is a Mumbai-based real estate search portal which allows customers to search for housing based on geography, number of rooms, and various other filters. The company has 6,000 brokers and serves 40 cities in India including Chennai, Mumbai, Bengaluru, Kolkata and Delhi.

History

A group of twelve students from the Indian Institute of Technology, Bombay founded Housing.co.in in June 2012. The company purchased Housing.com from San Francisco-based internet entrepreneur, Peter Headington, and the telephone number 03-333-333-333 in September 2013 for a total of $1m.

Since its founding in 2012, Housing.com has raised four rounds of funding. The company raised $2.5 million in Series A funding from Nexus Venture Partners in June 2013. The company used the funds to create its Data Science Lab and to expand to four cities: Bengaluru, Gurugram, Pune, Hyderabad.

 The company raised another $19M in venture funding, led by Helion Venture Partners, in April 2014.

In early March 2015, the company had a nationwide brand launch, and revealed its new brand logo, colours and brand philosophy; with the tagline 'Look Up'. The brand launch was advertised in national newspapers and hoardings in several cities across India; and notably, on the company's social media pages.

In June 2015, Housing.com then-CEO Rahul Yadav accused Sequoia India MD Shailendra Singh of poaching Housing.com staff. Subsequently, he was asked to leave the company altogether, citing objectionable behaviour. Rishabh Gupta was temporarily in charge, before being replaced by Jason Kothari in November 2015.

Product
Housing.com lists properties submitted by users, either brokers or owners, on an interactive map. Search results are filtered by available rooms, lifestyle ratings, child friendliness index (CFI), and area-based pricing.

The company has mapped approximately 650,000 houses in India.

Data science lab (DSL)
Housing.com's Data Science Lab (DSL) has generated a number of "Heat Map" algorithms and demand flux maps based on these filters. The CFI heat map shows child friendliness in a particular area and it measures neighborhoods on three different criteria: number of schools, number of hospitals and parks, and proximity of these facilities to the area. The algorithms also demonstrate price variations in properties across the city.

Housing.com is also available as apps for Android and iOS.

Acquisition
Housing.com acquired real estate discussion forum, Indian Real Estate Forum (IREF), for $1.2 Million  and Realty BI, a risk assessment firm for realty projects, for $2 Million.
Housing.com acquired HomeBuy360, a cloud-based sales lifecycle management platform, for $2 million. They had been merged with Proptiger.

References

Real estate companies established in 2012
Real estate companies based in Mumbai
Internet properties established in 2012
Indian companies established in 2012
Indian real estate websites
Online real estate databases
2012 establishments in Maharashtra